Wannacut Lake is a lake in the U.S. state of Washington.

Wannacut Lake most likely derives its name from surveyor George Wanicut.

See also
List of lakes in Washington

References

Lakes of Okanogan County, Washington
Lakes of Washington (state)